A free nerve ending (FNE) or bare nerve ending, is an unspecialized, afferent nerve fiber sending its signal to a sensory neuron. Afferent in this case means bringing information from the body's periphery toward the brain. They function as cutaneous nociceptors and are essentially used by vertebrates to detect noxious stimuli that often result in pain.

Structure
Free nerve endings are unencapsulated and have no complex sensory structures. They are the most common type of nerve ending, and are most frequently found in the skin. They penetrate the dermis and end in the stratum granulosum. FNEs infiltrate the middle layers of the dermis and surround hair follicles.

Types
Free nerve endings have different rates of adaptation, stimulus modalities, and fiber types.

Rate of adaptation
Different types of FNE can be rapidly adapting, intermediate adapting, or slowly adapting. A delta type II fibers are fast-adapting while A delta type I and C fibers are slowly adapting.

Modality
Free nerve endings can detect temperature, mechanical stimuli (touch, pressure, stretch) or danger (nociception). Thus, different free nerve endings work as thermoreceptors, cutaneous mechanoreceptors and nociceptors. In other words, they express polymodality.

Fiber types

The majority of Aδ (A delta) fibers (group III) and C (group IV) fibers end as free nerve endings.

References

External links 
 
Nociception: Transduction. From the University of Utah.
 
Textbook in Medical Physiology And Pathophysiology: Essentials and clinical problems. Copenhagen Medical Publishers. 1999 - 2000
 
Somatosensory System from Dr. Daley of North Carolina Wesleyan College.

Somatosensory system